Lopo may refer to:

People

Surname
 Alberto Lopo (born 1980), Spanish football player
 Fausto Lopo de Carvalho, Portuguese pulmonologist
 Santiago Lopo (born 1974), Galician author

Given name
 Lopo Fernandes Pacheco (died 1349)
 Lopo Gomes de Abreu (1420–70s?), Portuguese nobleman
 Lopo Homem (16th century), Portuguese cartographer and cosmographer
 Lopo Soares de Albergaria
 Lopo Vaz de Sampaio
 Lopo de Almeida (1416–1486)
 Lopo de Alpoim (1400-?), Portuguese nobleman
 Lopo de Brito
 Lopo do Nascimento (born 1942), Angolan politician

Other
 Lopo house